Oshipumbu or Oshipumbu Shomugongo is a village in Ompundja Constituency, Oshana Region, northern Namibia. The name means "group of tall trees". Oshipumbu is in the Ondonga Traditional Authority and lies in the Lake Oponono area. There are two schools, namely Onevonga Primary School and Oshipumbu Combined School. The councilor of Oshipumbu is Adolf H. Uunona, a former teacher at the combined school. Clean water is available which has been provided by the Directorate of Rural Water Supply; water-points have been set up throughout the village. The inhabitants are small-scale subsistence farmers who keep livestock, such as cattle, goats, sheep, donkeys, and grow crops, such as maize and sorghum, for their own consumption.

References

Villages in Namibia